Jonathan Lindsey is an American politician who currently represents Michigan's 17th Senate district in the Michigan Senate. He was elected in the 2022 Michigan Senate election. He is a member of the Republican Party.

Michigan Senate
Lindsey ran for 17th in the 2022 Michigan Senate election as a Republican. He won the primary against Kim LaSata with 61.4% of the vote and the general election against Democrat Scott Starr with 65.4% of the vote.

Electoral history

References

External links

Living people
Republican Party Michigan state senators
People from Sturgis, Michigan
21st-century American politicians
Year of birth missing (living people)